Karl "Carlo" Dibiasi (19 October 1909 – 28 October 1984) was an Italian diver who competed in the 1936 Summer Olympics. He was born in Karneid, Austria-Hungary and died in Bolzano. He was the father of Klaus Dibiasi. In 1936 he finished tenth in the 10 metre platform event.

References

External links
 

1909 births
1984 deaths
Italian male divers
Olympic divers of Italy
Divers at the 1936 Summer Olympics
People from Karneid
Sportspeople from Südtirol
20th-century Italian people